Shamsul-hasan Shams Barelvi  (1917 – 12 March 1997) was a Pakistani Islamic scholar and a translator of classical Islamic texts from Persian and Arabic into Urdu. He was a professor of Persian and Arabic at Manzar-e-Islam in Bareilly, prior to his migration to Karachi, Pakistan.

His book Sarwar-e-Kaunain ki Fasahat won an award from the Government of Pakistan.

He lived and died in Karachi, Sindh, Pakistan where he migrated from British India. The later years of his life were plagued by health problems.  He had nine children in various countries and his wife died before him.  He received the Sitara-i-Imtiaz for his academic work in 1995.

Literary works
His works include: 
 Nizam-e-Mustufa by himself
  Sarwar-e-Kaunain ki Fasahat 
Ḥaz̤rat Ḥasan Raz̤ā Barelvī kī nʻat goʾī aur un ke divān-i zoq-i nʻat par nāqadānah naẓar 
 Auranzeb-Khutut ke Ayenah Mae 
  Aʻlā Ḥaz̤rat Imām Ahl-i Sunnat Maulānā Shāh Ḥāfiz Aḥmad Raz̤ā K̲h̲ān̲ Raz̤ā ke naʻtiyah kalām kā taḥqīqī aur adabī jāʾizah

Translation works
  Awaarif-ul-muwaarif (translation) by Shaikh-ul-Shuyukh Shihabuddin al-Suhrawardi
 Al-Ghunya li-talibi tariq al-haqq wa al-din (translation) by Shaikh Abdul-Qadir Gilani
 Nafahat al Uns (translation)  by Shaikh Nuruddin Jami
  Sad Maktubat (translation) by Shaikh Muniri
  Tareekh-ul-Khulufaa (translation) by  Imam al-Suyuti
 Imām Aḥmad Raz̤ā kī ḥāshiyah nigārī/jāʼizah nigār (translation ) by Imam Ahmad Raza Khan
 Qadiri Ridwi Majmu’ah Wazaaif (translation) by Shaykh Iqbal Nuri
 Ruq'at-e-Alamgir (translation) by Alamgir I
 Mukāshafat al-qulūb (translation) by Imam al-Ghazali
 Kitābulḥaqūq o kitābuṣṣidq (translation) by Imam al-Ghazali

References

1917 births
1997 deaths
Arabic–Urdu translators
Persian–Urdu translators
Muhajir people
Pakistani writers
Pakistani scholars
Recipients of Sitara-i-Imtiaz
Writers from Karachi
Islam in Pakistan
20th-century translators
Barelvis
People from Bareilly